Dorrie is a name. Notable people with the name include:

People
 Dorrie Nossiter (1893–1977), English jeweller and jewellery designer
 Doris Dörrie (born 1955), German film director, producer and author

Fictional characters
 John Dorrie, a fictional character on Fear the Walking Dead (season 4)
 Dorrie, a fictional plesiosaur in the Super Mario series, debuting in the video game Super Mario 64.

See also
 Dorie
 Dorries
 Dory (disambiguation)

Feminine given names